The 2010 UC Davis football team represented the University of California, Davis as a member of the Great West Conference (GWC) during the 2010 NCAA Division I FCS football season. Led by 18th-year head coach Bob Biggs, UC Davis compiled an overall record of 6–5 with a mark of 3–1 in conference play, placing second in the GWC. The team was outscored by its opponents 295 to 233 for the season. The Aggies played home games at Aggie Stadium in Davis, California.

Schedule

References

UC Davis
UC Davis Aggies football seasons
UC Davis Aggies football